Eugyroptera is a monotypic snout moth genus described by John David Bradley in 1977. Its single species, Eugyroptera robertsi, described by the same author nine years earlier, is known from Nigeria.

References

Phycitinae
Monotypic moth genera
Moths of Africa